John Kamana (born December 3, 1961) is a former American football running back. He played for the Los Angeles Rams in 1984 and for the Atlanta Falcons in 1987.

References

1961 births
Living people
American football running backs
USC Trojans football players
Los Angeles Rams players
Atlanta Falcons players